Zacompsia fulva is a species of picture-winged fly in the genus Zacompsia of the family Ulidiidae.

References

Ulidiinae